Charlotte Mandell (born 1968) is an American literary translator. She has translated many works of poetry, fiction and philosophy from French to English, including work by Honoré de Balzac, Gustave Flaubert, Jules Verne, Guy de Maupassant, Marcel Proust, Maurice Blanchot, Antoine de Baecque, Abdelwahab Meddeb, Bernard-Henri Lévy, Jean-Luc Nancy, Mathias Énard and Jonathan Littell.

Life
Charlotte Mandell was born in Hartford, Connecticut in 1968, the child of two academics. She was educated at Boston Latin School, Université de Paris III, and Bard College, where she studied French literature and film theory. She is married to the poet Robert Kelly.

Works

Translations
 Maurice Blanchot, The Work of Fire. Palo Alto: Stanford University Press, 1995.
 Antoine de Baecque, The Body Politic: Corporeal Metaphor in Revolutionary France, 1770-1800. Palo Alto: Stanford University Press, 1997.
 Maurice Blanchot, Faux Pas. Palo Alto: Stanford University Press, 2001.[6]
 Antoine de Baecque, Glory and Terror: Seven Deaths under the French Revolution. New York: Routledge, 2001.
 Maurice Blanchot, The Book to Come. Palo Alto: Stanford University Press, 2003.
 Jean Genet, Fragments of the Artwork. Palo Alto: Stanford University Press, 2003.
 Abdelwahab Meddeb, The Malady of Islam. Co-translated (as Ann Reid) with Pierre Joris. New York: Basic Books, 2003.
 Bernard-Henri Lévy, War, Evil, and the End of History. New York: Melville House, 2004.
 Jacques Rancière, The Flesh of Words. Palo Alto: Stanford University Press, 2004.
 Gustave Flaubert, A Simple Heart. New York: Melville House, 2004.
 Jean Daniel, The Jewish Prison. New York: Melville House, 2005.
 Sima Vaisman, A Jewish Doctor in Auschwitz. New York: Melville House, 2005.
 Guy de Maupassant, The Horla. New York: Melville House, 2005.
 Justine Lévy, Nothing Serious. New York: Melville House, 2005.
 Bernard-Henri Lévy, American Vertigo: Traveling America in the Footsteps of Tocqueville. New York: Random House, 2006.
 Jean-Luc Nancy, Listening. New York: Fordham University Press, 2007.
 Maurice Blanchot, A Voice from Elsewhere. Albany: State University of New York Press, 2007.
 Benoît Duteurtre, The Little Girl and the Cigarette. New York: Melville House, 2007.
 Pierre Bayard,Sherlock Holmes Was Wrong: Reopening the Case of the Hound of the Baskervilles. New York: Bloomsbury, 2008.
 Jean Paulhan, On Poetry and Politics (co-translated with Jennifer Bajorek and Eric Trudel). Champaign: University of Illinois Press, 2008.
 Marcel Proust, The Lemoine Affair. New York: Melville House, 2008.
 Peter Szendy, Listen: A History of Our Ears. New York: Fordham University Press, 2008.
 Pierre Birnbaum, Geography of Hope. Palo Alto: Stanford University Press, 2008.
 Honoré de Balzac, The Girl with the Golden Eyes. New York: Melville House, 2008.
 Abdelwahab Meddeb, Tombeau of Ibn Arabi and White Traverses, with an afterword by Jean-Luc Nancy. New York: Fordham University Press, 2009.
 Jean-Luc Nancy, The Fall of Sleep. New York: Fordham University Press, 2009.
 Jonathan Littell, The Kindly Ones. New York: HarperCollins, 2009.
 The Dalai Lama, My Spiritual Journey. San Francisco: HarperOne, 2010.
 Mathias Énard, Zone. Rochester: Open Letter Books, 2010.
 Jules Verne, The Castle in Transylvania. New York: Melville House, 2010.
 Jonathan Littell, The Invisible Enemy. Amazon Kindle Singles series, January 2011.
 François Bizot, Facing the Torturer. New York: Knopf, 2012.
 Jonathan Littell, The Fata Morgana Books. Two Lines Press, 2013.
 Mathias Énard, Street of Thieves. Open Letter, 2014.
 Jean-Luc Nancy, After Fukushima: The Equivalence of Catastrophes. Fordham University Press, 2014.
 Jonathan Littell, Syrian Notebooks: Inside the Homs Uprising. Verso, 2015.
 Claude Arnaud, Jean Cocteau: A Life. Yale University Press, 2016.
 Jean-Luc Nancy, Coming. Fordham University Press, 2016.
 Mathias Énard, Compass. New York: New Directions, 2017.
 Roland Buti, The Year of the Drought. Old Street Publishing, 2017.
 Mathias Énard, Tell Them of Battles, Kings, and Elephants. New York: New Directions, 2018.

References

1968 births
Living people
American translators
French–English translators
American women writers
American speculative fiction translators
21st-century American women